Coatit was a torpedo cruiser of the Italian Regia Marina built in the late 1890s. The ship, which was armed with twelve  guns and two  torpedo tubes, was too slow and short-ranged to be able to scout effectively for the fleet, so her career was limited. She saw action during the Italo-Turkish War in 1911–12, where she provided gunfire support to Italian troops in North Africa. She also caused a minor diplomatic incident from an attack on retreating Ottoman soldiers in Anatolia. Coatit was part of an international fleet sent to Constantinople when the city appeared to be at risk of falling to the Bulgarian Army during the First Balkan War. In 1919, she was converted into a minelayer and was sold for scrap in 1920.

Design

Her propulsion system consisted of a pair of horizontal triple-expansion steam engines each driving a single screw propeller, with steam supplied by eight Blechynden water-tube boilers. She had a crew of between 153–185.

Coatit was armed with a main battery of twelve  L/40 guns mounted singly. She was also equipped with two  torpedo tubes.

Service history

The keel for Coatit was laid down at the Castellammare shipyard on 8 April 1897 and her completed hull was launched on 15 November 1899. After completing fitting-out work, the new cruiser was commissioned into the Italian fleet on 1 October 1900. She proved to be too slow and short-legged to be useful as a fleet scout, which limited her active duty career. She served in the main fleet in 1902–1904, during which time the fleet was kept in a state of readiness for seven months. For the remaining five months, the ships had reduced crews. In 1904, the ship was transferred to the Red Sea and stationed in Italy's colony in Eritrea along with the corvette , the gunboat , and the aviso  Coatit was assigned to the hostile force that was tasked with simulating an attempt to land troops on Sicily during the 1908 fleet maneuvers.

Italo-Turkish War and the Balkan Wars

At the outbreak of the Italo-Turkish War against the Ottoman Empire in September 1911, Coatit was stationed in the 4th Division of the 2nd Squadron, under Rear Admiral Paolo Thaon di Revel, the commander of the division. Coatit protected several battleships and armored cruisers while they bombarded the defenses of Tripoli on 3–4 October. Coatit, the armored cruiser , and sixteen destroyers were tasked with patrolling the flanks of the bombardment force to prevent a surprise attack by the Ottoman Navy, which did not materialize.

Negotiators were sent ashore to attempt to secure the surrender of the garrison, which was refused. Napoli and the armored cruisers bombarded the Ottoman positions throughout the day, and on 18 October the Ottomans withdrew, allowing the Italian troops to come ashore and take possession of the port. The fleet remained offshore and helped to repel Ottoman counterattacks over the following two weeks. On 3 October 1912, Coatit bombarded the port of Kalkan. She thereafter shelled an Ottoman infantry battalion in the area, which fled; she nevertheless continued to fire on the retreating troops, expending around 200 rounds during the attack. The French cruiser  was nearby and witnessed the attack, which her commander protested as a breach of international law.

Coatit was among an international force that entered the Ottoman capital city, Constantinople, during the First Balkan War in November 1912, less than a month after the end of the Italo-Turkish War. Warships from Germany, including the battlecruiser , Russia—the battleship —and Spain arrived thereafter. The ships put a force of about 3,000 men ashore to protect their nationals, though by the end of the month, the Bulgarian advance on the city had been halted. The international fleet nevertheless remained in the Sea of Marmara for a time until it was withdrawn to the island of Crete and subsequently dispersed.

World War I and fate
By 1914, Coatit had been assigned to the Division for Special Purposes, part of the 2nd Squadron of the Italian fleet. The division consisted of the two s and the two s, for which Coatit served as the scout vessel. Italy, a member of the Central Powers, declared neutrality at the start of World War I in August 1914, but by May 1915, the Triple Entente had convinced the Italians to enter the war against their former allies. Admiral Paolo Thaon di Revel, the Italian naval chief of staff, believed that Austro-Hungarian submarines could operate too effectively in the narrow waters of the Adriatic, which could also be easily seeded with minefields. The threat from these underwater weapons was too serious for him to use the fleet in an active way. Instead, Revel decided to implement blockade at the relatively safer southern end of the Adriatic with the main fleet, while smaller vessels, such as the MAS boats, conducted raids on Austro-Hungarian ships and installations.

After the war, Coatit was converted into a minelayer in 1919. Eight of the 76 mm guns and her torpedo tubes were removed and a pair of  L/40 guns were installed. She served only briefly in this role and she was sold to ship breakers on 11 June 1920.

Notes

References

External links
 Coatit Marina Militare website 

Agordat-class cruisers
Cruisers of Italy
Ships built in Castellammare di Stabia
1899 ships